Bandwidth smearing is a chromatic aberration of the reconstructed image of a celestial body observed by an astronomical interferometer that occurs because of the frequency bandwidth.  In Fourier terms, the different frequencies of the bandwidth probe different spatial frequencies which results in a reconstruct map containing elongated radial features.

It is overcome by going to higher spectral resolutions or, in radioastronomy, by using different centres of phase for image reconstruction.

References
 Bridle, Alan H. and Schwab, Frederic R., Wide Field Imaging I: Bandwidth and Time-Average Smearing in Synthesis imaging in radio astronomy (1989), eds. Richard A. Perley, Frederic R. Schwab, Astronomical Society of the Pacific Conference Series, vol. 6, p. 247.

Interferometry